Kominite (meaning 'the chimneys') are several minor andesite peaks in the Vitosha Mountains near Sofia, Bulgaria. The peaks are in the upper valley of the Dragalevska River near the Bay Krastyo tourist site. The Kominite peaks can be reached easily from Dragalevtsi via the Bay Krastyo or the Goli Vrah chair lift stations.

See also
Komini Peak, a mountain in Antarctica named for Kominite

Mountains of Bulgaria
Vitosha
Landforms of Sofia City Province